CRT Line 3 (and the branch line branded as Konggang line) runs from north to south, linking the districts separated by Chongqing's two main rivers, the Yangtze (Chang Jiang) and Jialing rivers. Built by Japan's ODA project, it uses Hitachi, Ltd. monorail vehicles and technology. The first phase of the line began construction on 5 April 2007.  The initial segment from Lianglukou to Yuanyang (18 stations) opened on September 29, 2011, with a northern extension from Yuanyang to Jiangbei Airport opening on December 30, 2011 and a southern extension from Ertang (Currently Chongqing Jiaotong University) to terminus Yudong on December 28, 2012. At , plus  for Konggang branch line opened on December 28, 2016, Line 3 is the longest single monorail in the world by track length. Line 3 is also the world's busiest monorail line with a daily ridership of over 675,000 passengers per day.

There are interchange stations in central Yuzhong district for transfer to Jiefangbei CBD with Line 1 at Lianglukou and with Line 2 at Niujiaotuo.

Opening timeline

Service routes 
  – 
  – 
  – 
  –  (6-car trains only)

Current Stations

References 

 
Railway lines opened in 2011
Airport rail links in China
Monorails
Monorails in China
2011 establishments in China